Hebeloma ammophilum is a species of mushroom in the family Hymenogastraceae. It was described as new to science in 1978 by the Hungarian mycologist Gábor Bohus.

See also
List of Hebeloma species

References

ammophilum
Fungi described in 1978
Fungi of Europe